Christina Robinson may refer to:

Christina Robinson (actress) (born 1997), American child actress
Christina Robinson (Neighbours), fictional character in the Australian soap opera Neighbours

See also
Christine Robinson (born 1984), water polo player
 Robinson (name)